The Kollar carp (Cyprinus carpio x Carassius auratus) is a hybrid fish obtained by crossing common carp (Cyprinus carpio) and goldfish (Carassius auratus). Described by the Austrian zoologist Johann Jacob Heckel, its binomial name pays tribute to his compatriot, entomologist Vincenz Kollar. Having been considered a separate species from its original relatives, this fish has as synonym Carpio kollarii (Heckel, 1836). Although this carp is most often found in fish farms, they have also been recorded from the wild.

References 

 Georges Cuvier and Achille Valenciennes, t. premier, Paris, F. G. Levrault, 1828, 573 p.( DOI 10.5962/bhl.title.7339, read online [archive]).
 Michel Pascal, Olivier Lorvelec, Jean-Denis Vigne, Philippe Keith and Philippe Clergeau"", Holocene evolution of the fauna of Vertebrés of France: invasions and disappearances, Paris, National Museum of Natural History,No. 154 biological invasions, July 10, 2003, p. 111-332(read online [archive] [PDF], consulted on January 8, 2019).

Cyprininae
Fish hybrids
Intergeneric hybrids